The 1964 USC Trojans football team represented the University of Southern California (USC) in the 1964 NCAA University Division football season. In their fifth year under head coach John McKay, the Trojans compiled a 7–3 record (3–1 against conference opponents), finished in a tie with Oregon State for the Athletic Association of Western Universities (AAWU or Pac-8) championship, and outscored their opponents by a combined total of 207 to 130. The Trojans ended their season with an upset victory over an undefeated Notre Dame that was ranked #2 in the AP Poll.

Quarterback Craig Fertig was one of the team's two captains and led the team in passing, completing 109 of 209 passes for 1,671 yards with 11 touchdowns and 10 interceptions. Mike Garrett led the team in rushing with 217 carries for 948 yards and nine touchdowns. Rod Sherman led the team in receiving yardage with 24 catches for 446 yards and five touchdowns.

Schedule

Game summaries

Notre Dame

References

USC
USC Trojans football seasons
Pac-12 Conference football champion seasons
USC Trojans football